Walter Strebi (24 October 1903 – 2 May 1981) was a Swiss sprinter. He competed in the men's 100 metres event at the 1924 Summer Olympics.

References

External links
 

1903 births
1981 deaths
Swiss male sprinters
Olympic athletes of Switzerland
Athletes (track and field) at the 1924 Summer Olympics